Pierre Joubert (June 27, 1910 – January 13, 2002) was a French illustrator and comics artist. He was closely associated with the creation of Scouting and the popular look of Boy Scouts in France and Belgium, comparable to the American artist Norman Rockwell.

Biography

Pierre Joubert was born in Paris. Joubert was a young Scout himself, and attended the École des Arts Appliqués in Paris. His first amateur drawings appeared in Scouts de France in 1926. He graduated to the magazine L'Illustration in 1927 through 1934, but continued increasingly to focus on Scout-centered art in Scouting publications.

Joubert also was an illustrator of calendars, handbooks, boys' adventure novels, particularly the Signe de Piste (Trail Sign) line (where he worked with René Follet). The style of Joubert's illustrations depicted idealized boys experiencing the glories of Scouting and comradeship. Joubert is considered, owing to his eye for trend and his mass-market exposure, to have had reflective influence on boy-culture in France from the 1930s until the close of the 1960s. He made the comic book Gribouille, Scout (1935) and two books of the Pouf series.

Joubert had his controversial side; in the 1940s, the Nazis banned all French Scouting but through Vichy; thus, Joubert worked with Vichy and has been tarred with "collaboration." He also did work for some right-wing Catholic journals and, as with any artist, the particulars of his patrons have been imputed to him. Not long before his death, Joubert produced a large volume of memoirs and reprinted art, Souvenirs en vrac. He died in La Rochelle at age 91.

References

Bibliography

 The Jungle Book by Rudyard Kipling
 Treasure Island by Robert Louis Stevenson

External links

 Books and media of the artist's work
 Pierre Joubert was the draftsman of the newspaper of the World Scout Jamboree of 1947 in Moisson, France: Jamboree 1947 
 Pierre Joubert at the Lambiek Comiclopedia

1910 births
2002 deaths
Artists from Paris
French illustrators
French comics artists
People associated with Scouting
Scouting and Guiding in France